The Rural Municipality of Hamiota is a former rural municipality (RM) in the Canadian province of Manitoba. It was originally incorporated as a rural municipality on June 28, 1895. It ceased on January 1, 2015 as a result of its provincially mandated amalgamation with the Town of Hamiota to form the Hamiota Municipality.

Communities 
 Decker
 Lavinia
 McConnell
 Oakner
 Pope

References

External links 
 
 Map of Hamiota R.M. at Statcan

Hamiota
Populated places disestablished in 2015
2015 disestablishments in Manitoba